Aspidolite is a mica group phyllosilicate mineral which is the sodium analogue of the magnesium-rich mineral phlogopite. The ideal chemical formula for aspidolite is NaMg3AlSi3O10(OH)2.

References

Mica group
Sodium minerals
Magnesium minerals
Aluminium minerals
Monoclinic minerals
Minerals in space group 12